Conchita Martínez and Patricia Tarabini were the defending champions, but competed this year with different partners. Martínez teamed up with Arantxa Sánchez Vicario and reached the semifinals, while Tarabini teamed up with Nicole Arendt and lost in quarterfinals to Barbara Schett and Patty Schnyder.

The tournament was cancelled in the semifinal round due to several delays caused by bad weather. Tournament organisers decided to priorize the conclusion of the singles tournament, with players being forced to play two rounds on a single day.

Seeds 
The first four seeds received a bye into the second round.

Draw

Finals

Top half

Bottom half

References

External links 
 Official Results Archive (ITF)
 Official Results Archive (WTA)

Bausch und Lomb Championships - Doubles
Doubles